Joni Taylor (née Crenshaw; born March 7, 1979) is the head women's college basketball coach for Texas A&M. Prior to Texas A&M, she was head coach at Georgia from 2015 to 2022.

Playing history
Born Joni Crenshaw in Meridian, Mississippi, she was the 1997 Gatorade Player of the Year for her home state, after leading Meridian High School to a 67-7 record during her junior and senior seasons. She also won three state titles in track and field. While attending the University of Alabama, she helped the Crimson Tide to the 1998 and 1999 NCAA Tournaments and the 2000 and 2001 Women's National Invitation Tournaments. She was a two-year starter and scored 716 points, grabbed 555 rebounds and blocked 103 shots, making her No. 4 among the school's career leaders. She received her bachelor's degree in education from Alabama in 2002.

Coaching history
Taylor has been an assistant coach at LSU (2010–11), an associate head coach at Alabama (2008–10), an assistant then associate head coach at Louisiana Tech (2005–08), and an assistant coach at Troy (2002–05). She joined the University of Georgia staff in 2011, spending one season as an assistant coach, before being promoted to associate head coach. In April 2015, Coach Landers announced his retirement and gave full support for Taylor to replace him. She became only the second full-time head coach in program history.

Taylor coached her team to a 21–10 record in her inaugural year, including five wins against ranked opponents and an invitation to the NCAA tournament, which earned her the Spalding Maggie Dixon Rookie Coach of the Year award.

In 2021, Taylor was named SEC Coach of the Year, following a season of leading her team to the SEC tournament finals and generating interest in a top seeding in the NCAA tournament.

On March 23, 2022, Taylor was officially announced as the new head coach for Texas A&M.

Head coaching record

Personal life
Taylor is married to Darius Taylor, a former women's basketball assistant coach for South Carolina. They were married in August 2015 and reside in Athens, Georgia. The Taylors have a daughter who was born in 2016, shortly before the start of the Lady Bulldogs' 2016–17 season. Their second daughter was born in 2019.

See also
List of current NCAA Division I women's basketball coaches

References

External links
Profile at georgiadogs.com

1979 births
Living people
Alabama Crimson Tide women's basketball coaches
Alabama Crimson Tide women's basketball players
American women's basketball coaches
Basketball coaches from Mississippi
Basketball players from Mississippi
Centers (basketball)
Georgia Lady Bulldogs basketball coaches
Louisiana Tech Lady Techsters basketball coaches
Power forwards (basketball)
Sportspeople from Meridian, Mississippi